Chetan Anand (3 January 1921 – 6 July 1997) was a Hindi film producer, screenwriter and director from India, whose debut film, Neecha Nagar, was awarded the Grand Prix Prize (Now Golden Palm) at the first ever Cannes Film Festival in 1946. Later he co-founded Navketan Films with his younger brother Dev Anand in 1949.

Biography

Early life
Anand was born on 3 January 1921, in Lahore, British India, to well-to-do advocate Pishori Lal Anand. He went to Gurukul Kangri Vishwavidyalaya to study Hindu scriptures and  graduated in English from Government College Lahore. He remained a member of Indian National Congress in the 1930s, subsequently worked for the BBC and taught at the Doon School, Dehradun for a while, before coming down to Bombay to sell a film script.

Career
In the early 1940s, while he was teaching History, he wrote a film script on king Ashoka, which he went on to show to director Phani Majumdar in Bombay. Anand failed to qualify for the Indian Civil Service (ICS) exams in London. As luck would have it, Phani Majumdar cast him as a lead in his Hindi film, Rajkumar, released in 1944. He also became associated with Indian People's Theatre Association (IPTA) in Bombay present day Mumbai.

He soon took to film direction with the well-acclaimed movie Neecha Nagar which won the Palme d'Or (Best Film) award (then known as 'Grand Prix') at the Cannes Film Festival in 1946. It was the debut film for Kamini Kaushal and became the first Indian film to gain international recognition and was the debut of Pandit Ravi Shankar.

By the early 1950s, he and his younger brother Dev Anand had set up Navketan Productions in Bombay present day Mumbai. Afsar, starring Dev Anand and Suraiya, was the first film made by Navketan, which turned out to be a moderate success. It was followed by Taxi Driver and Aandhiyan, both of which he directed for the Navketan banner.

While he made his reputation as a director, Anand kept on acting too occasionally. He appeared in Humsafar made in 1957. In 1957, he directed two movies Arpan and Anjali, in which he played lead roles too. He went on to act in Kala Bazar, Kinare-Kinare, Aman, Kanch Aur Heera and Hindustan Ki Kasam, which he directed too.

Later on Anand started his own production banner called Himalaya films and teamed up with photographer Jal Mistry, music director Madan Mohan, lyrics writer Kaifi Azmi and actress Priya Rajvansh. Together they gave some of most memorable and unique films in Hindi cinema like Haqeeqat, Heer Raanjha, Hanste Zakhm, and Hindustan Ki Kasam.

Anand is known to be the film-maker who 'discovered' Rajesh Khanna from an acting competition. Khanna as a result got his first break and was cast by Anand in the film Aakhri Khat, although G.P.Sippy's 'Raaz' introducing Rajesh Khanna and Babita was the first 'released' film for Rajesh Khanna. Aakhari Khat is known for its beautiful locations, songs penned by Kaifi Aazmi, composed by Khayyam, the beautiful lady Indrani Mukherjee and the child star 'Bunty'. Actually Bunty and the music were the main attractions of this film. Anand later directed Rajesh Khanna in the film Kudrat, based on the theme of reincarnation.

Apart from 17 feature films he is also known for the acclaimed television serial, Param Vir Chakra, which was aired Doordarshan in 1988.

Personal life
In 1943, Anand married Uma Chatterji, a Bengali Christian woman of Brahmin heritage. Uma's father, Gyanesh Chandra Chatterji, was the principal of Government Law College, Lahore, and he was the son of Rev. Probhat Chandra Chatterji, a Christian priest. Uma's mother, Ila Chatterji, was a first cousin of Mona Singha, better known as Kalpana Kartik, wife of Chetan's older brother Dev Anand. Kalpana Kartik's father and Uma's maternal grandmother were brother and sister. Also, Uma was a sister of Pakistani Bharatanatyam dancer Indu Mitha. 

Anand and Uma quickly became the parents of two sons, Ketan Anand and Vivek Anand. However, they separated within a few years of marriage, and Uma Anand then became the companion of Ebrahim Alkazi, a Muslim theatre professional. Until 1956, it was legally impossible for Hindus (and nearly impossible for Christians) to get a divorce. Therefore, despite open adultery, the couple remained legally married to each other.

In the 1960s, many years after being estranged from his wife, Anand fell in love with Priya Rajvansh, who had made her debut as heroine of his film Haqeeqat. The two fell in love during the making of this film, and their relationship lasted all their lives. Priya Rajvansh worked in every single film made by Anand beginning with Haqeeqat, and more surprisingly, she did not work in a single film made by anyone else. Since Anand was a legally married man, the two were unable to formalize their relationship, and they had no children together.

Anand died aged 76 on 6 July 1997 in Mumbai. He bequeathed a sizable portion of his wealth to Priya Rajvansh. This included the right of lifelong residence in his sprawling beachfront bungalow in Ruia Park, Juhu, Mumbai, where real estate is among the most expensive in India. She was given no right to sell the property, which would revert to Anand's sons upon her death; the arrangement was made because Priya Rajvansh and Anand had no children together, and this would enable her to live her whole life in the house that she had shared with him for two decades, while not depriving his sons of this valuable piece of real estate.

On 27 March 2000, three years after his death, Priya Rajvansh was murdered in the same beachfront bungalow. Both of Anand's sons, Ketan and Vivek, were arrested for the murder. They were convicted and given the sentence of life imprisonment. However, they were granted bail after spending two years in jail.

Legacy
Chetan Anand: The Poetics of Film, a book written by his wife Uma Anand and son Ketan Anand (Himalaya Films Media Entertainment), was released in 2006. A documentary by the same name made by Ketan Anand was released in 2008.

A retrospective of his films was held at the Stuttgart Film Festival and at the India International Centre, New Delhi in 2007.

Filmography

Director
Films
 Neecha Nagar (1946)
 Afsar (1950)
 Aandhiyan (1952)
 Taxi Driver (1954)
 Funtoosh (1956)
 Arpan (1957)
 Kinare Kinare (1963)
 Haqeeqat (1964)
 Aakhri Khat (1966)
 Heer Raanjha (1970)
 Hanste Zakhm (1973)
 Hindustan Ki Kasam (1973)
 Jaaneman (1976)
 Saheb Bahadur (1977)
 Kudrat (1981)
 Haathon Ki Lakeeren (1986)

TV series
 Param Veer Chakra (1988)

Producer
 Saheb Bahadur (1977)
 Haathon Ki Lakeeren (1986)

Actor
 Kala Bazar (1960)
 Arpan (1957)
 Kinare Kinare (1963)

Awards
 1946: Palme d'Or (Best Film), Cannes Film Festival: Neecha Nagar
 1965: National Film Award for Second Best Feature Film: Haqeeqat
 1982: Filmfare Best Story Award: Kudrat

References

External links
 
 Heer Ranjha – The Cinema of Chetan Anand

Film producers from Mumbai
Hindi-language film directors
Indian male screenwriters
1915 births
1997 deaths
Government College University, Lahore alumni
The Doon School faculty
20th-century Indian film directors
Punjabi people
Directors of Palme d'Or winners
20th-century Indian screenwriters
20th-century Indian male writers
People from Lahore